The Mauritanian Cup known as Republic President Cup is the top knockout tournament of the Mauritanean football. It was created in 1976.

Winners

Performance by club

Rq
 ACS Ksar (includes ASC Sonader Ksar)

See also
 Mauritanian Premier League
 Mauritanian Super Cup

References

External links
 Mauritania Cup Winners - rsssf.com

Football competitions in Mauritania
Mauritania